Júlio is a Portuguese masculine given name. The equivalent in Spanish is Julio.

The diminutive form is Julinho, as in Júlio César Teixeira known as Julinho, a Brazilian footballer.

See also
Julio (disambiguation)
Julio (given name)
Julio (surname)

Portuguese masculine given names